St Fillans railway station served the village of St Fillans, in the historical county of Perthshire, Scotland, from 1901 to 1951 on the Lochearnhead, St Fillans and Comrie Railway.

History
The station was opened on 1 October 1901 by the Lochearnhead, St Fillans and Comrie Railway. On the westbound platform was the station building and to the north was the goods yard. It also had a signal box. The station closed on 1 October 1951.

References

Disused railway stations in Perth and Kinross
Former Caledonian Railway stations
Railway stations in Great Britain opened in 1901
Railway stations in Great Britain closed in 1951
1901 establishments in Scotland
1951 disestablishments in Scotland